Myra Merritt is an American operatic soprano, who was born in Washington, DC. She earned a Bachelor of Music from the Peabody Conservatory of Music, and a Master of Music from the Catholic University of America.

She made her debut with the Metropolitan Opera in 1982, as the Shepherd in Tannhäuser, conducted by James Levine. She was to appear with that company many times through 1991, including appearances in L'enfant et les sortilèges (as the Fire, directed by John Dexter), the Centennial Gala (the duet from Don Giovanni), La bohème (as Musetta, opposite Plácido Domingo), Les contes d'Hoffmann (as Antonia, conducted by Julius Rudel), Porgy and Bess (as Clara), L'italiana in Algeri (as Elvira) and Don Giovanni (as Zerlina). Elsewhere, she has sung under Sarah Caldwell and Mstislav Rostropovich.

Merritt has performed in many capitals and cities throughout Europe and the United States. In 2007, Deutsche Grammophon issued a DVD of her 1986 Met performance of L'italiana in Algeri, with Marilyn Horne, and Levine conducting Jean-Pierre Ponnelle's production.

Currently, the soprano is Professor of Voice at Bowling Green State University, in Ohio.

References 
 The Metropolitan Opera Encyclopedia, edited by David Hamilton, Simon and Schuster, 1987.

External links 
 YouTube - Marilyn Horne - Ti presento di mia man 'L'Italiana in Algeri  YouTube: Myra Merritt in an excerpt from L'italiana in Algeri, with Marilyn Horne (1986).

American operatic sopranos
Living people
20th-century African-American women singers
20th-century American women opera singers
African-American women opera singers
Peabody Institute alumni
Catholic University of America alumni
Bowling Green State University faculty
Year of birth missing (living people)
Singers from Washington, D.C.
Classical musicians from Washington, D.C.
African-American women academics
American women academics
African-American academics
21st-century American women